In Greek mythology, Bisaltes, son of Helios and Gaia, was the eponymous hero of the Bisaltae and Bisaltia in Thracian Macedonia. Theophane was the daughter of Bisaltes.

Notes

References 
 Gaius Julius Hyginus, Fabulae from The Myths of Hyginus translated and edited by Mary Grant. University of Kansas Publications in Humanistic Studies. Online version at the Topos Text Project.
 Stephanus of Byzantium, Stephani Byzantii Ethnicorum quae supersunt, edited by August Meineike (1790-1870), published 1849. A few entries from this important ancient handbook of place names have been translated by Brady Kiesling. Online version at the Topos Text Project.

Children of Helios
Thraco-Macedonian mythology